Ube crinkles, also known as purple yam crinkles, are Filipino cookies made from purple yam, flour, eggs, baking powder, butter, and sugar. They are characteristically deep purple in color and are typically rolled in powdered sugar or glazed. They have a crunchy exterior and a soft chewy center.

See also
Ube cake
Paciencia (cookie)
Pandesal
Pan de monja (Monáy)
 List of cookies

References 

Cookies
Philippine desserts
Ube dishes